Torenia fournieri, the bluewings or wishbone flower, is an annual plant in the Linderniaceae, with blue, white, or pink flowers that have yellow markings. It is typically grown as a landscape annual, reaching 12–15 in. tall. It has simple opposite or subopposite leaves with serrated edges.

Gallery

References

Linderniaceae